The women's discus throw event at the 2003 European Athletics U23 Championships was held in Bydgoszcz, Poland, at Zawisza Stadion on 19 and 20 July.

Medalists

Results

Final
20 July

Qualifications
19 July
Qualifying 54.50 or 12 best to the Final

Participation
According to an unofficial count, 17 athletes from 12 countries participated in the event.

 (3)
 (2)
 (2)
 (1)
 (2)
 (1)
 (1)
 (1)
 (1)
 (1)
 (1)
 (1)

References

Discus throw
Discus throw at the European Athletics U23 Championships